Emileigh Rohn is a solo artist who produces the electronic music project Chiasm sold by COP International records. She has released five albums; Disorder, Relapse, Reform, 11:11, and Reset. Her music has been featured on many compilation CDs, in the PC video game Vampire: The Masquerade – Bloodlines by Troika Games, on the CBS television series NCIS and in the independent film Extinguish released by Outsider Filmworks. The name Chiasm (Greek χίασμα, "crossing") comes from the biology term of the crossing of optic neurons in the brain that allow people to have continuous and peripheral vision (see Optic chiasm). Chiasm is produced in Detroit, MI United States.

Origin 
At the age of five, Emileigh Rohn began taking piano lessons from her church organist, Mildred Benson, and eventually began singing solos in church. By the age of 13 she received a Casiotone keyboard and began experimenting with electronic music. In her final year of high school she joined an experimental/industrial performance art group called Inter Animi.

In the fall of 1997, while studying molecular biology in Detroit, Rohn joined Calvin P. Simmons in his project Dragon Tears Descending (DTD) as a keyboardist doing performances and supporting other bands. Rohn then left DTD and formed her own project Electrophoretic Transfer with sampling from Shane Terpening by 1998.

Chiasm began in 1998 when Rohn began to entirely produce her own music with her first demo CD named  "Embryonic" completed in October. Her song "Bouncing Baby Clones" featured on a Detroit Electronica compilation CD, D[elEcTROnIc]T, in the spring of 1999. Later that year, she signed to COP International records, and her first officially released track, "Chiasm" was soon featured on their compilation, "Diva X Machina vol. 3".

Discography

Disorder
Released in March 2001. A remix album with labelmate Threat Level 5, entitled "Divided We Fall", was also released in 2003. The track "Isolated" was later used in the NCIS episode "Marine Down" and the Vampire: The Masquerade - Bloodlines computer game. The song "Formula" contains audio samples from  Independence Day.

Tracks
 Formula
 Chiasm 5.0
 Transparent
 Disorder
 Fight
 Liquefy
 Isolated
 Cold
 Enemy
 Someone

Relapse
Released in May 2005.

Tracks
 Embryonic
 Surrender
 Delay
 Rewind
 Still
 X-Ray
 Incision
 Phobic
 Needle
 Chosen Fate
BONUS TRACKS: Rewind (Floating Tears Mix by ZIA), Surrender (Dark Techno Mix by Threat Level 5)

Prefrontal
Released in April 2006. Only available on iTunes.

Tracks
 Prefrontal, Part 1
 Prefrontal, Part 2
 Prefrontal (Carphax Files Remix)
 Biomod "Seed" (Chiasm Mix)
 Biomod "Seed" (Piano Mix)
 A Girl Called Harmony
 Cryostat

Reform
Released in September 2008.

Tracks
 Deny
 Soulprint
 Unity
 The Caffeine Cycle
 Reform
 A Section Of Time
 Deceivers
 Won
 Incubate
 Extinguish

Apple Island
Released in May 2009.

Tracks
 Apple Island
 Fake Smile
 Major Tom (English version)
 Reform (Soil & Eclipse remix)
 Won (:10: remix)

Obligatory
Released in February 2012. Only available on iTunes.

Tracks
 Don't Panic
 Obligatory 2.0
 Obligatory (DYM remix)
 Reliance (Eric Chamberlain Remix)
 Reliance (Red Flag Remix)

11:11
Released in October 2012.
 Petals
 Angry Tree
 I Want Some More
 The Sea
 Hideaway
 So Lost
 Draw A House
 Answer In My Mind
 Reliance
 Obligatory
 Space

Reset
Released in March 2019.

 World Left
 The Puzzle
 Sky Crane
 Mice on a Wheel
 Locked In
 Stumble
 Make Believe
 Ella
 Space Lights
 Enough
 Red Outside

External links
 Official Chiasm site
 Official Chiasm example tracks
 
 

Year of birth missing (living people)
Living people
American industrial musicians
Women rock singers
Musicians from Ann Arbor, Michigan
21st-century American women singers
21st-century American singers